Esteban Muth (born 30 October 2001) is a Belgian-German racing driver who currently drives for  Walkenhorst Motorsport in Deutsche Tourenwagen Masters.

Career
Muth made his motorsport debut in karting in 2010 and mainly competed in championships in Belgium and the Netherlands. In 2012, he won the Mini Parilla class of the Belgian Championship. In 2015, he started competing in international championships with a twelfth place in the KFJ class of the German ADAC Kart Masters. In 2016 and 2017, he competed in the OK Junior and OK classes respectively of both the European and World Karting Championships. In his senior year, he finished tenth in the world championship.

In 2018, Muth switched to formula racing, making his debut in the French F4 Championship. He won two races at the Circuit de Spa-Francorchamps and the Circuito Permanente de Jerez and also achieved podium finishes at the Circuit de Pau-Ville, Dijon-Prenois and Jerez. With 145.5 points, he finished seventh in the standings.

In 2019, Muth started the season in the Toyota Racing Series, where he drove for the M2 Competition team. He won a race at the Bruce McLaren Motorsport Park and was also on the podium at the Hampton Downs Motorsport Park and the Manfeild: Circuit Chris Amon. With 258 points, he finished fifth in the final standings. He then returned to Europe, where he made his debut in the Eurocup Formula Renault with M2. He only drove the first race weekend at the Autodromo Nazionale Monza, where he finished nineteenth and fifteenth. After this, he competed in a race weekend of the Japanese Formula 3 Championship with the OIRC team YTB by Carlin during the race weekend at the Sportsland Sugo as a one-time replacement for Charles Milesi, finishing the races in eleventh, eighth and tenth. At the end of the year, he drove a Mercedes-AMG GT3 in the race at the Circuit de Barcelona-Catalunya in a race of the Blancpain GT Series Endurance Cup for Strakka Racing, finishing nineteenth.

In 2020, Muth only drove two race weekends of the GT4 European Series with the Selleslagh Racing Team in a Mercedes-AMG GT4 at Spa and Circuit Paul Ricard. He was not eligible for points, but finished on the podium in both races at Spa.

In 2021, Muth made his DTM debut with the T3 Motorsport team in a Lamborghini Huracán GT3 Evo. He scored a total of 41 championship points and finished the season 13th in the drivers' championship. Ahead of his second season in the series in 2022, he moved to the Walkenhorst Motorsport team to drive a BMW M4 GT3 alongside Marco Wittmann.

For 2023, Muth joined Vanwall Racing Team as a test driver for their Le Mans Hypercar entry.

Racing record

Career summary

† As Muth was a guest driver, he was ineligible to score points.
* Season still in progress.

Complete French F4 Championship results 
(key) (Races in bold indicate pole position) (Races in italics indicate fastest lap)

Complete Toyota Racing Series results 
(key) (Races in bold indicate pole position) (Races in italics indicate fastest lap)

Complete Deutsche Tourenwagen Masters results 
(key) (Races in bold indicate pole position) (Races in italics indicate fastest lap)

Muth was unable to attend the last two raceweekends of the 2022 season due to an urgent surgery he had to undergo right before the race at the Red Bull Ring.

References

2001 births
Living people
People from Uccle
Belgian racing drivers
Racing drivers from Brussels
French F4 Championship drivers
Toyota Racing Series drivers
Japanese Formula 3 Championship drivers
Blancpain Endurance Series drivers
Deutsche Tourenwagen Masters drivers
Carlin racing drivers
Formula Renault Eurocup drivers
Strakka Racing drivers
M2 Competition drivers
German racing drivers
Karting World Championship drivers
GT4 European Series drivers